Harry Kitten and Tucker Mouse is a children's book written by George Selden and illustrated by Garth Williams. It is the prequel to The Cricket in Times Square. Farrar, Straus and Giroux, originally published the book in 1986.

Plot
The book tells the story of the young mouse who becomes Tucker, and the kitten who becomes Harry, the two friends of Chester Cricket in The Cricket in Times Square.

Tucker, we learn, was born in a box of Kleenexes and other odds and ends on Tenth Avenue, and fled his nest at a young age to avoid sanitation workers. He takes his name from "Merry Tucker's Home-Baked Goods", a bakery on Tenth Avenue. He meets Harry Kitten, who took his name from two children he heard talking. One said "Harry-you're a character!" and the kitten decided he too wanted to be a character.

The two become friends and search New York City for a home of their own.  Their wanderings take them to the basement of the Empire State Building and to Gramercy Park, among other places.  Eventually, they settle down in a disused drain pipe in the Times Square subway station.

Reception
Kirkus Reviews found that "The generously ample, well-designed format makes an appropriate backdrop for Williams' vigorously comic re-creations of these new antics of old favorites."  while Publishers Weekly saw that "the characters of these quintessential New Yorkers are as vibrant and joyful as they ever were,"

References

1986 American novels
American children's novels
Novels set in New York City
Books about cats
Prequel novels
Children's novels about animals
1986 children's books